The 2020 season was Kelantan United's 5th year in their history and first season in the Malaysia Premier League following promotion 2019 season. Along with the league, the club also participated in the Malaysia FA Cup and the Malaysia Cup.

Events
 On 15 September 2020, Zahasmi Ismail contract has been terminated.

 On 6 December 2020, the club announced Akira Higashiyama as club's new head coach.

 On 10 October 2020, the club confirmed their slot in the Malaysia Cup after a narrow 2-1 victory over Selangor II in the league match.

 On 23 January 2020, the club has confirmed three foreign players signed a contract with the club.

 On 18 September 2020, Nazrulerwan Makmor joined the club as new head coach.

Players

Competitions

Malaysia Premier League

League table

Statistics

Appearances and goals
Players with no appearances not included in the list. The plus (+) symbol denotes an appearance as a substitute, hence 2+1 indicates two appearances in the starting XI and one appearance as a substitute.

|-
! colspan=14 style=background:#dcdcdc; text-align:center| Goalkeepers

|-
! colspan=14 style=background:#dcdcdc; text-align:center| Defenders

|-
! colspan=14 style=background:#dcdcdc; text-align:center| Midfielders

|-
! colspan=14 style=background:#dcdcdc; text-align:center| Forwards

|-

References

2020
Kelantan United